Spencer Lee Gettys (June 8, 1916 – November 18, 2004) was an American Negro league catcher in the 1930s.

A native of Rock Hill, South Carolina, Gettys attended Radnor High School where he was a star football player, and went on to attend Delaware State University. He played for the Bacharach Giants in 1936. After a longtime career as a stonemason, Gettys resumed his formal education, receiving degrees from Temple University and Antioch University. He died in Philadelphia, Pennsylvania in 2004 at age 88.

References

External links
Baseball statistics and player information from Baseball-Reference Black Baseball Stats and Seamheads

1916 births
2004 deaths
Bacharach Giants players
20th-century African-American sportspeople
21st-century African-American people